Kale - Tagondaing Station Puplic Hospital (also spelled as Khale - Tagundaing Station Hospital) is a public hospital in Kale, Tagondaing, Kyain Seikgyi Township, Kayin State, Myanmar.

History
Kale-Tagundaing Station Hospital was formerly opened as Rural health Department. It had been transformed as Public hospital from 31 August 1967 and then it had been upgraded as Station Hospital on 1969.

In 2015, a new building with 20 beds were developed.

References

Buildings and structures in Kayin State